The Office of the Auditor General of Norway is the state auditor of the Government of Norway and directly subordinate of the Parliament of Norway. It is responsible for auditing, monitoring and advising all state economic activities, including financial audits, performance audits and corporate control. Located in Oslo, it is led by a board of five auditors general elected for four years and from 2014 it has been led by Per-Kristian Foss. It is regulated by the Auditor General Act of June 1, 2005.

The office has about 460 employees, mostly recruited among economists, lawyers and social scientists.

History
The office dates back to 1814 when the Constitution of Norway §75 stated that there were to be appointed five auditors by the Parliament of Norway with the first auditors being appointed in 1816. In 1822 the Ministry of Auditing (Revisjonsdepartementet) was created as a supplement to the office that originally bore the name Statsrevisjonen (lit. the State Auditing). When the current Parliament of Norway Building opened in 1866 the office followed along and stayed in the building until 1890. In 1918, the system is changed and all state auditing is taken over by the office, removing the ministry. In 1938, with 64 against 63 votes, the Parliament of Norway changed the office's name to the current Riksrevisjonen (lit. the National Auditing). In 1962, the auditing of the Norwegian State Railways, Telegrafverket and the Postal Service were included in the office.

Auditor Generals
The Auditor General is the head of the Office.

1816–1821 : Marcus S. Lyng
1821–1827 : Frederik Motzfeldt
1827–1834 : Lauritz Nicolai Kraft
1827–1845 : Peter L. Stabel
1834–1846 : Søren Anton Wilhelm Sørenssen
1848–1854 : Johan D. Rye
1854–1881 : Peter Daniel B. W. Kildal
1882–1883 : Peder Krabbe Gaarder
1883–1898 : Hagbard Berner
1898–1923 : Svend Borchmann Hersleb Vogt
1923–1925 : Tore Embretsen Aaen
1926–1949 : Hans T. H. Lütken
1949–1950 : Saamund Olsen Bergland
1950–1978 : Lars Breie
1978–1980 : Tor Oftedal
1981–1990 : Petter Furberg
1990–2005 : Bjarne Mørk Eidem
2005–2013 : Jørgen Kosmo 
2014–2021: Per-Kristian Foss
2022–Present: Karl Eirik Schjøtt-Pedersen

External links

References

 
Norway
Government agencies of Norway
Government agencies established in 1816
Storting
Supreme audit institutions
1816 establishments in Norway